Hanan Ben Ari (born 8 April 1988) is an Israeli singer, songwriter, and musician.

Biography 
Ben Ari was born and raised in Karnei Shomron, Israel. Ben Ari's father, Herzl Ben Ari, was former head of the Karnei Shomron Council. Ben Ari studied at the state-religious school "Barkai" and at the local high school, "Halichot Olam". Musically influenced by his father, who is also a bard and cantor, he began to write music at the age of 13. He published some of his first poems on the "" website.

At the age of 17, he began studying at a hesder yeshiva and served in the IDF in the  Netzah Yehuda Battalion. In 2008, he married Hadas. They lived in Bnei Brak for six months, then in Ramat Amidar for four years, near the Ramat Gan Yeshiva where he was a student. Later they moved to Or Yehuda. Ben Ari taught at "Adar" high school in Petah Tikva and was the lead vocalist in the wedding band "Kolot". Hanan and his wife were reporters for Olam Katan  newspaper and the founding editors of the Olam Katan magazine.

In 2013, Ben Ari created the educational musical show "Teenagers" with the musicians Yaacov Asraf and Nir Rubin.

In 2014, Ben Ari wrote and performed the song "Vatikh Miriam" with the band "Voices" and dancer and choreographer Sagi Ezran, which took third place in the national dance music contest that year.

In December 2014, Ben Ari released his first single, which entered the Galgalatz playlist, reached fourth place in the station's weekly ranking and won the 34th place in the station's annual chart for the hebrew year . The single was released as part of Ben Ari's debut album, "Balance", which was published with the help of crowdfunding on the Headstart website from July to August 2015. The amount raised as part of the campaign was the third highest amount raised for an Israeli album at the time.

The album was released in February 2016 and received positive reviews and even reached gold album status.

January 2016, in preparation for the release of the album, Ben Ari released a fourth single from the album, "", inspired by his young daughter. The song became a hit and Ben Ari qualified for the top of the radio airplay chart for the first time, and reached the first place in the weekly chart of Media Forest, the song was parodied in tv program Eretz Nehederet. In response, Ben Ari created a parody of the song "" by Eretz Nehederet. Another single from the album, "," reached the 16th place in the parade of Galgalatz for the same year.

Ahead of the release of his second album, Ben Ari released the singles: "Not Alone", "Thanks to you", "On my bed", in which he collaborated with the Mediterranean pop singer Moshe Peretz, and "", the lyrics of which he wrote with Keren Peles. The song "Wikipedia" reached the second place in the annual parade of Galglatz for the Hebrew year 5777 and the third place in the annual parade of the Network 3 in the same year. He then won ACUM song of the year award in 2017.

In December 2017 he released the single "What do you want from me" and in March 2018 he released the song "Good News". In April 2018 he released his second album "".

With Maccabi Tel Aviv's victory in the 2018–19 Israeli Premier League, Ben Ari performed the championship song "", as a renewal of the song sung by Ethnix in the 1995–96 Liga Leumit.

In February 2019, he released the single "", composed by Ben Ari in collaboration with Nathan Goshen.

In May 2019, he released a single called "", which deals with the intergenerational gap on issues such as faith and preserving tradition. The song provoked mixed reactions in the religious sector and beyond.

In February 2020, he released the music video "". The song came in second place in the annual Hebrew hymn parade of Galgalatz and Ynet and in the mako parade for the Hebrew year of 5780.

In November, he released the music video "", which went straight to the first place in the Media Forest weekly chart. The song reached the ninth place in the annual parade of Galgalatz in the Hebrew year 5781.

In May 2021 he released the single "" which he wrote together with his brother Neria.

The following month he performed on 4 consecutive days at the Caesarea Maritima theater.

Because of the Coronavirus outbreak of 2019, no  was awarded in 2020. In 2021, Ben Ari retroactively won the Akum Award for "Artist of the Year" and most played song of 2020 for "If You Want".

On September 6, 2021, he won "Singer of the Year" in the annual  song parade.

On December 6, 2021, Ben Ari released a music video for his single "".

On March 28, 2022, he was supposed to release the rhythmic song "Ela Bi" but since the shooting attack in Hadera took place the day before, he chose to postpone its release and instead released the song "". About nine months later, on December 12, 2022, he released the song "Ela Bi".

June 2022, the musical "Champion of the World" premiered at the Orna Porat Children's Theater, which included Ben-Ari's songs.

On June 26, he released the music video single "" (from a live performance) that talks about his grandfather, after whom he is named.

On July 14, he performed at the opening ceremony of the 2022 Maccabiah Games in the presence of Israeli president Isaac Herzog, Israeli Prime Minister Yair Lapid and United States President Joe Biden.

On September 9, 2022 he released a live album titled .

Family 
Ben Ari's uncle is former Knesset member Michael Ben-Ari. Hanan's brother, Naria, became less religious when Hanan was young. The two wrote together the song "Achim" dealing with the subject, which  appeared on the show "Teenagers". The song was also included in Ben Ari's first album, in which he performs it in a duet with Ivri Lider, and is one of two songs from the show that were included in the album, along with "Hindyk". Later they together wrote the song "Dream like Yosef" which was released in 2021.

Hanan is married to Hadassah Ben Ari and they live with their six children in Pardes Hanna-Karkur.

Discography

Studio albums 

  (2016)
  (2018)

Live albums 

  (2022)

References

People from Pardes Hanna-Karkur
Israeli magazine editors
Israeli composers
Israeli singer-songwriters
Israeli rock singers
Israeli pop singers
1988 births
Living people